Tortonese's stingray (Dasyatis tortonesei) is a species of stingray of the family Dasyatidae. It occurs in the eastern Atlantic from Morocco to Mauritania, and is also found in the  Mediterranean Sea.

References 

Tortonese's stingray
Fish of the Mediterranean Sea
Tortonese's stingray